Stavros Mavrothalassitis Stadium is a football stadium in Egaleo, Athens, Greece. It is currently used mostly for football games and is the home stadium of Egaleo FC. it has an effective capacity of 8,217 people. It was built in 1968 and named after Stavros Mavrothalassitis mayor of Egalo in the 1960s.
Ilisiakos F.C. also use the stadium currently.

Sports venues completed in 1968
Football venues in Greece
Sports venues in Athens
Egaleo F.C.
1968 establishments in Greece